The Our Lady of the Assumption Cathedral is a religious building belonging to the Roman Catholic Church and is located in the town of Buka on the south coast of the island of Buka, in the autonomous region of Bougainville, formerly ″province of Bougainville″ which is part of Papua New Guinea a country in Oceania.

The cathedral follows the Roman or Latin rite and depends on the Roman Catholic Diocese of Bougainville (Dioecesis Buganvillensis), which in turn is under the responsibility of the Congregation for the Evangelization of Peoples (Congregatio pro Gentium Evangelizatione).

The ancient cathedral of the diocese was the church of St. Michael the Archangel in Tubiana, in the same province.

See also
Roman Catholicism in Papua New Guinea
Our Lady of the Assumption Church (disambiguation)

References

Roman Catholic cathedrals in Papua New Guinea
Catholic Church in the Autonomous Region of Bougainville
Buka, Papua New Guinea